The Tehachapi Wind Resource Area (TWRA) is a large wind resource area along the foothills of the Sierra Nevada and Tehachapi Mountains in California.

The mountain pass acts as a venturi effect to air moving between ocean and desert, increasing wind speed.

This area is a net exporter of generation to other parts of the state of California. A state initiative to upgrade the transmission out of Tehachapi (the 4.5 GW Tehachapi Renewable Transmission Project) began in 2008 and was completed by 2016. This has opened the door to further regional wind power development up to 10 GW, and multiple solar and storage projects are installed to utilize that capacity.  A prime location for viewing the turbines is off of State Route 58 and from Tehachapi-Willow Springs Road.

Wind farms
The Tehachapi Wind Resource Area is home to 5 independently owned and operated wind farms as of February 2020.

Tehachapi Renewable Transmission Project

The development of the Tehachapi Wind Resource Area began in 2009 in conjunction with the development of the Tehachapi Renewable Transmission Project. The transmission project was required to support new wind developments in the area at the time including Alta-Oak Creek Mojave Project which was part of Alta Wind Energy Center, the largest wind farm in the world .

See also

Wind farms in California
List of onshore wind farms

References

Wind farms in California
Mojave Desert
Tehachapi Mountains
Geography of Kern County, California